North Arkansas College (Northark) is a public community college in Harrison, Arkansas. It serves the citizens of Boone, Carroll, Marion, Searcy, Newton, and Madison counties in northern Arkansas.  Northark has two campuses in Harrison and one in Berryville, Arkansas.

Academics
Northark offers several Associate degrees as well as certificates and continuing education courses and experiences.

Students and staff
Northark has an enrollment of 40% male and 60% female.  Seventy-five percent of Northark students receive some form of financial aid.  Fall 2016 headcount enrollment was 1,889.

Northark employs 201 full-time faculty and staff and approximately 205 part-time faculty and staff.

Accreditation 
North Arkansas College is accredited by Higher Learning Commission.

References

External links
Official website

1974 establishments in Arkansas
Community colleges in Arkansas
Education in Boone County, Arkansas
Educational institutions established in 1974
NJCAA athletics
Harrison, Arkansas